Be Happy may refer to:

 Be Happy (TV series), a 2011 Singaporean TV series
 Be Happy (Rina Aiuchi album), 2001
 Be Happy, a 1999 album by Yurisangja
 "Be Happy" (Mary J. Blige song), 1993
 "Be Happy" (Dixie D'Amelio song), 2020
 "Be Happy", a song by Personz

See also
 Don't Worry, Be Happy (disambiguation)
 "Sameach" ("Be Happy"), the Israeli entry in the Eurovision Song Contest 2000